Blister beetle dermatitis is a cutaneous condition that occurs after contact with any of several types of beetles, including those from the Meloidae and Oedemeridae families. Blister beetles secrete an irritant called cantharidin, a vesicant that can get onto humans if they touch the beetles.

The term "blister beetle dermatitis" is also occasionally and inappropriately used as a synonym for Paederus dermatitis, a somewhat different dermatitis caused by contact with pederin, an irritant in the hemolymph of a different group of beetles, the rove beetles.

Symptoms and signs
After skin comes in contact with cantharidin, local irritation begins within a few hours.  (This is in contrast to Paederus dermatitis, where symptoms first appear 12–36 hours after contact with rove beetles.) Painful blisters appear, but scarring from these epidermal lesions is rare.

Diagnosis
Typical Vesicles/Blister at site where beetle salivates.

Treatment
Wash with soap and water.
Cold application
Topical Steroid and Antihistamines application.

See also 
 List of cutaneous conditions
 Skin lesion

References

External links
 Research paper describing both blister beetle dermatitis and Paederus dermatitis, with photos of both

Parasitic infestations, stings, and bites of the skin
Meloidae